Labocerina is a genus of flies in the family Stratiomyidae.

Species
Labocerina atrata (Fabricius, 1805)

References

Stratiomyidae
Brachycera genera
Taxa named by Günther Enderlein
Diptera of South America